Juan Mignaburu (c. 1870-1930s) was an Argentine politician, who served as president of the Asociación Amateurs de Football in 1919. He also took care of the management of the Club Atlético Independiente, being his president in 1911-1912, 1917-1918 and 1920-1921.  

Mignaburu was also coach of Independiente, in 1912 he directed the final against Club Atlético Porteño.

The Argentine Football Association set a tournament that bears his name and which was played on five occasions between Argentina and Uruguay, with five Argentine triumphs between 1935 and 1943.

References

External links 
www.afa.com.ar

1870s births
1930s deaths
People from Buenos Aires
People from Avellaneda
Club Atlético Independiente managers
Argentine football chairmen and investors
Argentine people of Basque descent
Argentine people of Spanish descent
Argentine politicians
Río de la Plata
Argentine football managers